Widdowson is a surname. Notable people with the surname include:

Albert Widdowson (1864–1938), English cricketer
Bob Widdowson (born 1941), English professional footballer
Elsie Widdowson (1908–2000), British food scientist
Grace Widdowson (1892 –1989), New Zealand nurse and hospital matron
Henry Widdowson, British linguist
Joe Widdowson (born 1989), English footballer
Martin Widdowson, Royal Air Force officer
Ralph David Widdowson (1903-1969), Associate Professor at Pennsylvania State University
Samuel Weller Widdowson (1851–1927), English footballer and cricketer
Mike Widdowson, English Earth Scientist